Jason Joseph Francis Carlos Diaz Ejercito (born June 4, 1995), known professionally as Kiko Estrada, is a Filipino actor who is best known for his role in Tween Hearts on GMA Network before he transferred to ABS-CBN, where he appeared in Angelito: Ang Bagong Yugto and Annaliza. In 2014, he moved back to GMA Network, where he appeared on several television dramas.

Background
Estrada was born in Manila. His mother, Cheska Diaz, is a former actress, and his father, Gary Estrada, is an actor who also serves as board member of Quezon Province. He is the grandson of Paquito Diaz and George Estregan. His parents have separated and each remarried, and he has several younger half-siblings. Of these, he has three half-sisters—Garielle Bernice, Garianna Beatrice and Gianna Bettina—from his father's present wife, Bernadette Allyson, and he has a half-brother, Stefan, and a half-sister, Gabrielle Alexi, from his mother's present husband, Carlos Morales.

Estrada went to high school at Colegio San Agustin, and he attended college at College of St. Benilde, where he enrolled in the diplomatic affairs program. His parents were the main force that urged him to go into show business. He began acting lessons in ABS-CBN’s Star Magic in 2010.

Estrada was in a relationship with former Kapamilya and now Kapuso actress Devon Seron, but then confirmed their split in April 2021. Also has 
previous relationship with Barbie Forteza. He was previously in a relationship with fellow Kapamilya actress, Heaven Peralejo.

Career
In 2011, Estrada's first appearance was in Reel Love: Tween Hearts. He played a supporting role in the youth-oriented television series and he teamed up with Barbie Forteza. The show ended in June 2012.

In 2012, four months after Tween Hearts ended, Estrada moved to ABS-CBN for non-contractual acting. In his new station, his first acting stint was a supporting role in noontime television series, Angelito: Ang Bagong Yugto. The series ended in December 2012.

In 2013, Estrada formally signed a contract with ABS-CBN and started his time at the station by landing a role in Asia’s longest drama anthology Maalaala Mo Kaya in the episode "Krus" where he was cast as the leading man of Julia Montes. He was also part of the remake of Annaliza where he played a supporting role.

In July 2013, Estrada announced his first foray into the movie world with a movie called Chasing Boulevards with co-star Kim Rodriguez and Teejay Marquez. He also appeared in Minute to Win It as a contestant joining the team of Star Magic Circle 2013.

In 2014 Estrada was originally part of the main cast of Mirabella as Julia Barretto's leading man but was later replaced by Enrique Gil and Sam Concepcion. After months of hiatus he came back and signed an exclusive contract with GMA Network via Strawberry Lane. He is paired with his Chasing Boulevard co-star Kim Rodriguez. He also played a callboy who learned about his father's true identity after his own father became his customer in Magpakailanman.

In November 2018, he became part of ABS-CBN's show Pamilya Ko a month after his contract with GMA Network expired.

In October 2020, he landed a lead role and became part of ABS-CBN's show Bagong Umaga. He was paired with fellow Kapamilya actress Michelle Vito.

Estrada is the ex-boyfriend of Devon Seron. He confirmed their breakup last April 2021. Months after their breakup, the actor confirmed that he is dating Heaven Peralejo. Estrada and Peralejo broke up this year.

Filmography

Television drama

Drama anthology

Film

Awards

References

External links

Living people
Filipino male television actors
Male actors from Manila
Kiko
Kiko
Kiko
GMA Network personalities
ABS-CBN personalities
Star Magic
De La Salle–College of Saint Benilde alumni
1995 births
Filipino people of Spanish descent
Filipino people of Mexican descent